Petraliella is a genus of bryozoans belonging to the family Petraliidae.

The genus has almost cosmopolitan distribution.

Species:

Petraliella africana 
Petraliella asanoi 
Petraliella bisinuata 
Petraliella buski 
Petraliella concinna 
Petraliella crassocirca 
Petraliella denticulata 
Petraliella dentilabris 
Petraliella dorsiporosa 
Petraliella elongata 
Petraliella globulata 
Petraliella intermediata 
Petraliella magna 
Petraliella marginata 
Petraliella megafera 
Petraliella pirikaensis 
Petraliella ramifica 
Petraliella serratilabrosa 
Petraliella snelliusi 
Petraliella tractifera 
Petraliella umbonata

References

Bryozoan genera